The Lists of Slavs and Germans was the collective name given to the political parties representing Slovene and German minorities in northern Italy between World War I and the Fascist regime.

Most Slovene-speakers resided in the Julian March, most German-speakers in South Tyrol.

History
In the Julian March the list was organised by Josip Vilfan. In South Tyrol it consisted of the Deutscher Verband (DV), a political party formed by the merger of the Christian-democratic Tiroler Volkspartei (TVP) and the national-liberal Deutschfreiheitliche Partei (DFP); the DV was successively led by Eduard Reut-Nicolussi and Karl Tinzl.

In the 1921 general election the Lists won a combined 1.3% of the vote and 9 seats in the Chamber of Deputies.

In the 1924 general election the Lists won a combined 0.9% and 4 seats.

In 1922 the Lists opposed the formation of Benito Mussolini's Fascist government, which would forbid other languages and all the parties except the National Fascist Party. Consequently, the Lists ceased to exist.

Election results

Chamber of Deputies

Results by districts

References

Defunct political parties in Italy
Political parties of minorities
Banned political parties
Defunct political parties in South Tyrol